Book, Zahedan is a village in Hormak Rural District, in the Mirjaveh of Zahedan County, Sistan and Baluchestan Province, Iran. At the 2006 census, its population was 209, in 35 families.

References

Populated places in Zahedan County